Schwartzman is a surname. Notable people with the surname include:

 Diego Schwartzman, professional tennis player, formerly top-10 in the world
 Dov Schwartzman, Haredi Jewish rabbi and rosh yeshiva (dean) of Bais Hatalmud
 Jason Schwartzman, American actor and musician
 Jesse Schwartzman, American lacrosse player 
 John Schwartzman, American cinematographer
 Robert Carmine (previously Robert Schwartzman), American actor and musician
 Seymour Schwartzman, American cantor and opera singer
 Yaakov Eliezer Schwartzman, Orthodox Jewish rabbi and rosh yeshiva

See also 
 Spelling variations
 Aron Schvartzman (also Aarón Schvartzman and Aron Schwartzman) (born 1908), Argentine chess master
 Schwartzmann
 Schwarzman
 Schwarzmann

German-language surnames
Jewish surnames